Benjamin Voisin (born December 24, 1996) is a French actor. For his role as David Gorman in the dramatic film Summer of 85, he was nominated for the César Award 2021 and the Lumière Award.

Filmography

Film

Television

References

External links
 

1996 births
Living people
French male film actors
French male television actors
21st-century French male actors
French National Academy of Dramatic Arts alumni
Cours Florent alumni